Shifty Adventures in Nookie Wood is the fifteenth solo studio album by Welsh rock musician John Cale. It was released on 1 October 2012 in Europe and 2 October in North America on the Double Six Records imprint of Domino Records. It was released as digital download, heavyweight vinyl and CD. Most of the songs were recorded by John Cale in his own studio in Los Angeles. On one track he collaborated with Danger Mouse. In September 2011 Cale released the Extra Playful EP and its release promised that the new album would be released the following year. It is his first studio album since 2005's blackAcetate.

Release
Shifty Adventures in Nookie Wood was released in three standard versions: on CD, on double vinyl LP and as digital download (mp3 320 kbit/s and wav 16-bit / 44.1). When pre-ordering the vinyl-edition, it came with one of three one-track mystery bonus 7" singles. "Bluetooth Swings Redux" (5:25), "Hatred" (3:58) or "Cry" (5:33).

Singles
First single from this album "I Wanna Talk 2 U" was released on 6 July 2012 as digital download. Second single "Face to the Sky" was released in August (on the B-side was "Living with You (Organic Mix)"). It was released both in digital format and vinyl SP).

Critical reception

Critical reception of the album has been mixed to positive. The Guardian newspaper called the album "it's an album that combines the 70-year-old's experience with the glee of a small child." Online magazine Slant Magazine called it "both provocative and strange."

Weekly charts

Track listing
All songs written and composed by John Cale except "I Wanna Talk 2 U" (words by John Cale, music by Cale and Brian Burton).

Personnel
Musicians
John Cale – vocals, keyboards, piano, organ, synths, electric and acoustic guitars, electric viola, bass guitar, percussion, drum machine, drum programming, noises
Dustin Boyer – guitars, synths, noises, tambo, backing vocals
Danger Mouse a.k.a. Brian Burton – bass, synth, drum programming on "I Wanna Talk 2 U"
Michael Jerome Moore – drums, percussion, cajón
Joey Maramba – bass
Deantoni Parks − drums in "Bluetooth Swings Redux"
Erik Sanko − bass in "Scotland Yard"
Eden Cale − background vocals in "Hemingway"
Production
John Cale – producer, arranger
Dustin Boyer – recording
Kennie Takahashi – recording on "I Wanna Talk 2 U"
Todd Monfalcone – recording on "I Wanna Talk 2 U"
Adam Moseley – mixing, programming
Mickey Petralia – mixing
Robin Lynn – programming
Nita Scott – executive producer
Andy Romanoff – photography
Rob Carmichael, Seen – artwork & design
Brian Burton a.k.a. Danger Mouse – producer on "I Wanna Talk 2 U"
Recorded at: A.R.M. Studio, Los Angeles, CA and Mondo Studio, Los Angeles, CA

References 

John Cale albums
Albums produced by John Cale
2012 albums
Double Six Records albums